Reena Roy (born Saira Ali; 7 January 1957), is an Indian actress. At the age of 15, she made her film debut with the drama Zaroorat (1972), but gained wider public recognition with her roles in the romantic comedy Jaise Ko Taisa (1973) and the romance-action film Zakhmee (1975). By 1976, Roy became one of the highest-paid actresses of Bollywood after starring in two of the year's biggest box-office successes, the action thriller Kalicharan and the horror film Nagin.

Roy won the Filmfare Award for Best Supporting Actress for her performance in the drama Apnapan (1977), but declined it due to categorical issues. Her success nevertheless continued throughout the late 1970s and early 1980s when she featured in several notable films including the horror film Jaani Dushman (1979), the dramas Aasha (1980), Arpan (1983) and Asha Jyoti (1984), the multi genre Naseeb (1981) and the romantic comedy Sanam Teri Kasam (1982). In 1983, Roy married cricketer Mohsin Khan and announced a sabbatical. She subsequently shifted to Pakistan with her husband and gave birth to their daughter, Jannat, better known as Sanam Khan.

Roy returned to India in 1992 after divorcing Khan and made a comeback in Hindi cinema with the drama Aadmi Khilona Hai (1993). She further acted in supporting roles notably in the romance-action films Ajay (1996) and Gair (1999), and the romantic drama Refugee (2000). Since the early 2000s, she has primarily focused on raising her daughter, but has made occasional appearances on television, most recently on Indian Idol. Along with her sister Barkha, Roy also runs an acting school.

Personal life and background 
Roy was born Saira Ali, the third daughter of Sadiq Ali, a small-time actor and Sharda Rai, who acted in film Bawre Nain and later produced the film Gunehgar Kaun. She has three siblings who all disowned their father after the parents divorced. Her mother renamed all the four children after the divorce. Roy was initially renamed Roopa Rai, which was changed to "Reena Roy" by the producer of her first film, Zaroorat. Roy started acting in films in her teens. She disputed reports that her decision to enter films was to financially support her mother and siblings.

Roy has two sisters, Barkha and Anju and a brother, Raja. Following a highly-publicised love affair with Shatrughan Sinha, in 1983, Roy decided to quit the film industry to marry Pakistani cricketer Mohsin Khan. The couple later divorced in the 1990s; Roy found it difficult to adjust with Khan's flamboyant lifestyle. Roy initially lost custody of her daughter Sanam, but after her ex-husband remarried, Roy regained custody.

Career

Debut and breakthrough (1970–76) 
In 1971, Roy was cast by director B. R. Ishara in Nayi Duniya Naye Log opposite Danny Denzongpa, but the film was shelved and would not be released until 1973. Undeterred by the problems, Ishara offered Roy the leading role in his another directorial venture, Zaroorat. Roy was initially reluctant to select the project due to its risque subject and potentially controversial scenes, but agreed  later. Zaroorat was theatrically released in 1972, failing at the box office, but Roy's sensual performance was noted by contrast. Roy's subsequent roles too focused on her sex appeal, such as in Jaise Ko Taisa (1973), which became known for the track "Ab Ke Sawan Mein Jee Dare" in which Roy and Jeetendra dance together in heavy rain. The film was a box-office hit, and along with another successful release, Zakhmee (1975), where she had a supporting role, prompted filmmakers to approach Roy with more significant films.

Subhash Ghai's action thriller Kalicharan  (1976) made her more popular among directors and audiences.Initially, there was low expectations with Kalicharan, since Subhash Ghai, a failed actor, was making his directorial debut, and Shatrugan Sinha, an actor known for his villainous roles, was making his first mark as the lead hero. But the film defied everyone's expectations and became a surprise hit, and Reena as Shatrugan's love interest got attention from audiences. They became a off-screen pair as well. She also starred in another hit family drama Udhar Ka Sindur alongside Jeetendra in that year.

Roy's career-turning point came in 1976, when she featured as the title role in Rajkumar Kohli's thriller Nagin, which featured an ensemble cast including Sunil Dutt, Jeetendra, Rekha and Mumtaz. She avenges the death of her lover by ruthlessly murdering five leading male-stars. The film became a huge hit. Also appreciated by critics, Nagin became the highest-grossing production of the year. Analysing the film, writer Meheli Sen commented, "Reena Roy as the nagin is unabashed in her sexuality; [...] she embodies a kind of feral sexuality that remains remarkable in its directness." Roy also received a nomination for Filmfare Award for Best Actress at the 24th Filmfare Awards. Box Office India published that Roy established herself as a leading actress of Bollywood with the success of Kalicharan and Nagin.
. In a mixed review, The Illustrated Weekly of India lamented that Roy was used in the film for aesthetic purposes, but the film emerged as a major commercial success, turning Roy as well as Sinha into Bollywood stars.

Reena Roy-Shatrugan Sinha became a famous team after Kalicharan and had delivered 9 hits off the 16 they did together as the lead pair. But it was Reena's chemistry with Jeetendra in 17 marital dramas like Badaltey Rishtey (1978) and Pyaasa Sawan (1982) that set her career soaring. Jeetendra- Reena Roy had 12 box office hits off the 17 movies where they were paired romantically. The duo produced three of their greatest classics together - Apnapan (1977), Aasha (1980) and Arpan (1983). Reena's poignant dance in "Aasha" to the melody of "Shisha Ho Yah Dil" immortalized her as an icon of desire and tragedy. Her dark-shaded role in "Apnapan," as the selfish gold-digger that abandons her husband and child, won her the Best Supporting Actress Filmfare Award, beating out icons Nutan and Asha Parekh. (This was the precursor to the type of role that Meryl Streep played two years later in "Kramer vs. Kramer" (1979)). Reena rejected the Award on basis that she is the heroine of the film, not the supporting actress! And finally, her screen image as a sacrificing symbol of Indian womanhood is glorified in the immensely popular, "Arpan."
Jeetendra-Reena Roy have worked in 22 films together and in 17 movies they were paired romantically. 12 of the 17 films where she was heroine to Jeetendra were super-hits.

Stardom and establishment (1977–1985) 
In 1977, Roy garnered critical acclaim for playing Kamini, a gold-digger who abandons her husband (Jeetendra) for a much senior but richer man (Ifthekar) in J. Om Prakash's drama Apnapan. Vijay Lokapally of The Hindu stated that Roy "lives the role" and rated her performance superior to that of Jeetendra and Sulakshana Pandit. However, when Roy won the Filmfare Award for Best Supporting Actress at the 25th Filmfare Awards, she refused to accept it, citing that her role was parallel to Pandit's. 1978 saw Roy collaborating with Subhash Ghai for the second time on the action film Vishwanath, opposite Sinha, and in the following year, she re-united with Rajkumar Kohli for the horror film Jaani Dushman (1979). Both the films emerged as box-office hits. Regarding her performance in the latter, Film World remarked, "Reena Roy is easy on the eye and acts with effortless ease in a role which demands nothing.".
In the same year she was also starred in Raj Kumar Kohli's Muqabla (1979) alongside her then rumoured boyfriend Shatrughan Sinha.The film was very successful at box office.
Rajkumar Kohli worked with Reena and churned out greatest multi-starer blockbusters Nagin (1976 film) , Jaani Dushman, Muqabla (1979 film) and Raaj Tilak.

In 1980, Roy appeared as a rebellious daughter-in-law of Lalita Pawar in Vijay Sadanah's melodrama Sau Din Saas Ke. Although the film only a moderate financial success, Roy's work was picked up by critics for praise. Her most significant release of the year was the drama Aasha (1980), alongside Jeetendra, in which she played the titular role. She received a second nomination for Filmfare Award for Best Actress for her portrayal. It was a blockbuster success, as was the 1981 release Naseeb, a "masala" film directed by Manmohan Desai, which featured Roy alongside an ensemble cast of Sinha, Amitabh Bachchan, Rishi Kapoor and Hema Malini. India Today described the film as "enjoyable but terrible for your health", but Shahid Khan of Planet Bollywood commented that Roy nevertheless, "leaves a mark in her few dramatic scenes."

After the box office success of "Aasha," for which she received her second Filmfare nomination as Best Actress, Reena Roy entered the 1980s as a leading lady in demand, securing herself critical roles with Superstar Rajesh Khanna in 4 films which became super-hits. She is the defiant widow who reforms the egotistical Rajesh Khanna of Dhanwan (1981 film) ; the beautiful 'actress' that dies on stage performing her last 'mujra' for Dharmendra in Naukar Biwi Ka (1983); and the talented psychiatrist determined to cure Vinod Khanna in the comical, Jail Yatra (1981). Top directors like Prakash Mehra, Raj Khosla and Sultan Ahmad grabbed her for crucial roles. Her off-screen relationship with Shatrugan ended by 1979.
Reena Roy concentrated more on her career, as she was at the No. 1 position by 1980. Reena was trailed by Rekha, Hema Malini and Zeenat Aman for the number one spot from 1980 to 1983 until Sridevi arrived with a blockbuster called Himmatwala (1983 film) in early 1983.
In 1981, Roy performed a parallel leading role besides debutante Sanjay Dutt and Tina Munim in Sunil Dutt's romance-action film Rocky (1981), which emerged as a financial success.

In 1982 alone, she had thirteen releases, by far more than any of her contemporaries. She was not only effectively stealing the show from Rekha in emotional melodramas like Prem Tapasya (1983) and Asha Jyoti but also fetching the heroine role from most of the films they worked together, such as Nagin (1976 film), Jaani Dushman, Muqabla (1979 film) etc. This also signifies her star power and dominance over other actresses back then.
Her characters became more versatile, as did her dances, as she effortlessly shifted from classical 'natyam' (Rocky (1981)) to "Disco Station"  Haathkadi (1982 film). The sophisticated, glamorous model of Karishmaa, 1984 was equally seductive as the village belle of Dharam Kanta in 1982. Her profile was further enhanced with an extraordinary double role in the Muslim social, Ladies Tailor (1981), opposite Sanjeev Kumar.
At the pinnacle of her popularity, Reena's dormant desire to prove herself found expression in a number of female-oriented films. Enacting the role of a tormented 'bahu' in Sau Din Saas Ke (1980), she defies conventions to oppose her tyrant mother-in-law. With an author-backed role in Bezubaan (1982), she gives a realistic portrayal of a woman whose past returns to threaten her present married life. But it was Roy's presentation, Lakshmi (1982) that glorified the presence of Reena Roy in Bollywood cinema. Playing the role of a misfortune 'tawaif', she dances to her never-ending tragedies. Reena, anguished by the commercial failure of Lakshmi, found solace in the sensational success of her other home production - the musical comedy, Sanam Teri Kasam (1982), opposite upcoming Kamal Hasan and produced by her sister Barkha Roy.
This series of successful films continued in 1983 with Prakash's drama Arpan, also starring Jeetendra and Parveen Babi. Roy also appeared in T. Rama Rao's action film Andha Kanoon (1983) and the comedy Naukar Biwi Ka (1983) before announcing a sabbatical after marrying Mohsin Khan in the same year. In the following years, she continued to deliver hits and  a number of Roy's previously completed films were released and successful at the box office, notable ones being Kohli's epic Raaj Tilak (1984), Dasari Narayana Rao's melodrama Asha Jyoti (1984), J. P. Dutta's action-drama Ghulami (1985) and Satpal's drama Do Waqt Ki Roti (1988).

Sabbatical and sporadic work (1992—present) 
Roy returned to Bollywood in 1992, in a mature supporting role as a sister-in-law ('bhabhi') in Aadmi Khilona Hai (1993) but could not repeat her success of the early days of her career. Her last film appearance was in J. P. Dutta's Refugee (2000). She has since turned to acting in television serials, such as "Eena Meena Deeka," produced by her sister Barkha. After the serial ended, the sisters opened an acting school in 2004. Roy has also campaigned for the Indian National Congress.

Filmography

Awards and nominations

References

External links 
 
 
 https://web.archive.org/web/20010508162759/http://www.geocities.com/Hollywood/Cinema/2623/reena.html
 Hindustan Times
 http://www.parinda.com/profile/994/reena-roy

Reena roy.txt
Displaying Reena roy.txt.

Indian film actresses
1957 births
Actresses in Hindi cinema
20th-century Indian actresses
Living people
Filmfare Awards winners